The Pop Manifesto is a digital magazine, based in New York City, United States but was founded in Sydney, Australia. It focuses on counter culture and innovative creatives within the fields of music, fashion and design. Founded by Ilirjana Alushaj and Karl Maier, the pair claim the reason for its inception was to showcase the interesting people and projects they saw around them.  The first issue was released in December 2005 and has since built up a reputation for cutting edge design and quirky articles.

In September 2010, Ilirjana Alushaj created a record label under the same name.  To date, the label has released Blood Diamonds,  Magic Mountain, Typical Girls,  and Vital Caress.

References

External links
 Official website

2005 establishments in Australia
Music magazines published in the United States
Online magazines published in the United States
Music magazines published in Australia
Design magazines
Fashion magazines published in the United States
Independent magazines
Magazines established in 2005
Magazines published in New York City
Magazines published in Sydney
Zines